The qualifying rounds of the 2013 CAF Champions League were played from 15 February to 5 May 2013, to decide the eight teams which advanced to the group stage.

Draw
The draw for the preliminary, first and second qualifying rounds was held on 9 December 2012, at the CAF Headquarters in Cairo, Egypt, and the fixtures were announced by the CAF on 10 December 2012.

The following 56 teams were entered into the draw:
Byes to first round

 ES Sétif
 TP Mazembe
 Al-Ahly
 Djoliba
 Stade Malien
 Al-Hilal
 Al-Merrikh
 Espérance de Tunis

Entrants to preliminary round

 JSM Béjaïa
 Primeiro de Agosto
 Recreativo do Libolo
 ASPAC
 Mochudi Centre Chiefs
 ASFA Yennenga
 Vital'O
 Coton Sport
 Union Douala
 Olympic Real de Bangui
 Gazelle
 Djabal Club
 AC Léopards
 AS Vita Club
 AFAD Djékanou
 Séwé Sport
 Zamalek
 Sony Elá Nguema
 Saint George
 CF Mounana
 Real de Banjul
 Asante Kotoko
 Horoya
 Tusker
 Lesotho Correctional Services
 LISCR
 Al-Ittihad
 AS Adema
 FUS Rabat
 Moghreb Tétouan
 Maxaquene
 Olympic Niamey
 Enugu Rangers
 Kano Pillars
 APR
 Sporting Clube do Príncipe
 Casa Sports
 St Michel United
 Diamond Stars
 Orlando Pirates
 Mbabane Swallows
 Simba
 Dynamic Togolais
 CA Bizertin
 URA
 Zanaco
 Jamhuri
 Dynamos

Format
Qualification ties were played on a home-and-away two-legged basis. If the sides were level on aggregate after the second leg, the away goals rule was applied, and if still level, the tie proceeded directly to a penalty shoot-out (no extra time was played).

Schedule
The schedule of each round was as follows.

Preliminary round
The preliminary round included the 48 teams that did not receive byes to the first round.

|}

Zamalek won 7–0 on aggregate and advanced to the first round.

AS Vita Club won 5–1 on aggregate and advanced to the first round.

Saint George won 8–0 on aggregate and advanced to the first round.

CA Bizertin won 2–1 on aggregate and advanced to the first round.

Dynamos won 3–1 on aggregate and advanced to the first round.

Tusker won 7–1 on aggregate and advanced to the first round.

Zanaco won 3–2 on aggregate and advanced to the first round.

Orlando Pirates won 9–0 on aggregate and advanced to the first round.

Mochudi Centre Chiefs won 2–0 on aggregate and advanced to the first round.

2–2 on aggregate. Vital'O won on the away goals rule and advanced to the first round.

Enugu Rangers advanced to the first round after Sporting Clube do Príncipe failed to show up for the first leg.

Recreativo do Libolo won 5–0 on aggregate and advanced to the first round.

JSM Béjaïa won 3–0 on aggregate and advanced to the first round.

Asante Kotoko won 8–0 on aggregate and advanced to the first round.

Primeiro de Agosto won 4–3 on aggregate and advanced to the first round.

2–2 on aggregate. FUS Rabat won on the away goals rule and advanced to the first round.

Union Douala won 3–1 on aggregate and advanced to the first round.

Séwé Sport won 3–0 on aggregate and advanced to the first round.

AFAD Djékanou won 6–2 on aggregate and advanced to the first round.

0–0 on aggregate. Coton Sport won the penalty shoot-out and advanced to the first round.

1–1 on aggregate. Casa Sports won the penalty shoot-out and advanced to the first round.

Kano Pillars won 5–1 on aggregate and advanced to the first round.

AC Léopards won 2–1 on aggregate and advanced to the first round.

2–2 on aggregate. ASFA Yennenga won the penalty shoot-out and advanced to the first round.

First round
The first round included 32 teams: the 24 winners of the preliminary round, and the 8 teams that received byes to this round.

|}

Zamalek won 1–0 on aggregate and advanced to the second round.

Saint George won 3–1 on aggregate and advanced to the second round.

CA Bizertin won 3–1 on aggregate and advanced to the second round.

Al-Ahly won 4–1 on aggregate and advanced to the second round.

Orlando Pirates won 3–1 on aggregate and advanced to the second round.

TP Mazembe won 7–0 on aggregate and advanced to the second round.

Enugu Rangers won 2–0 on aggregate and advanced to the second round.

Recreativo do Libolo won 4–2 on aggregate and advanced to the second round.

1–1 on aggregate. JSM Béjaïa won on the away goals rule and advanced to the second round.

Espérance de Tunis won 2–0 on aggregate and advanced to the second round.

FUS Rabat won 3–1 on aggregate and advanced to the second round.

Séwé Sport won 5–4 on aggregate and advanced to the second round.

Coton Sport won 3–1 on aggregate and advanced to the second round.

Stade Malien won 4–1 on aggregate and advanced to the second round.

4–4 on aggregate. AC Léopards won on the away goals rule and advanced to the second round.

ES Sétif won 5–4 on aggregate and advanced to the second round.

Second round
The second round included the 16 winners of the first round. The winners of each tie advanced to the group stage, while the losers entered the Confederation Cup play-off round.

|}

3–3 on aggregate. Zamalek won on the away goals rule and advanced to the group stage. Saint George entered the Confederation Cup play-off round.

Al-Ahly won 2–1 on aggregate and advanced to the group stage. CA Bizertin entered the Confederation Cup play-off round.

Orlando Pirates won 3–2 on aggregate and advanced to the group stage. TP Mazembe entered the Confederation Cup play-off round.

Recreativo do Libolo won 3–1 on aggregate and advanced to the group stage. Enugu Rangers entered the Confederation Cup play-off round.

Espérance de Tunis won 1–0 on aggregate and advanced to the group stage. JSM Béjaïa entered the Confederation Cup play-off round.

1–1 on aggregate. Séwé Sport won on the away goals rule and advanced to the group stage. FUS Rabat entered the Confederation Cup play-off round.

Coton Sport won 3–0 on aggregate and advanced to the group stage. Stade Malien entered the Confederation Cup play-off round.

4–4 on aggregate. AC Léopards won the penalty shoot-out and advanced to the group stage. ES Sétif entered the Confederation Cup play-off round.

References

External links

1